The Somerville Community Path is a paved rail trail in Somerville, Massachusetts, running  from Massachusetts Avenue to Lowell Street via Davis Square. Opened in segments between 1985 and 2015, it follows part of the former Fitchburg Cutoff rail line. A  extension to East Cambridge will open in 2023 as part of the Green Line Extension project.

History

The east part of the Fitchburg Cutoff opened in 1870, connecting the Lexington and Arlington Railroad (Lexington Branch) to the Boston and Lowell Railroad. Only used for Boston and Maine Railroad freight trains after 1926, the line was abandoned as far east as Cedar Street in 1979 to allow construction of the Red Line Northwest Extension. The Somerville Community Path opened  from Davis Square to Cedar Street in 1994, with the  Massachusetts Avenue–Davis Square segment of the Alewife Linear Park becoming part of the Community Path. In 2013, construction began on a  extension to Lowell Street. The $2.2 million extension opened in mid-2015, with an official dedication ceremony on August 19.

Beginning in 2015, the state began a major re-evaluation of the GLX project due to significantly increased costs. In May 2016, the state indicated that the Community Path would only be built as far as Washington Street in the revised plan to avoid a costly bridge. In some sections, the path would be lowered to track level to eliminate costly retaining walls, resulting in fewer connections to cross streets than previously planned.

A consortium called GLX Constructors was selected as the winner for re-bid project in November 2017. Their proposal reduced costs enough to add the full Community Path extension back into the plan. However, the plans call for a -wide path, narrower than existing portions and the 12-foot width recommended in federal guidelines. Cycling advocates have raised concerns about safety of the narrowed path given the expected levels of bicycle traffic. The GLX and path extension were expected to be completed in late 2021; with was delayed to mid-2022, then November 2022.

, the extension is expected to open no earlier than April 2023.

References

External links 

 Friends of the Community Path

Rail trails in Massachusetts
Transportation in Somerville, Massachusetts
Parks in Middlesex County, Massachusetts
Bike paths in Massachusetts
1985 establishments in Massachusetts